Mukul Chadda is an Indian actor who works in Hindi cinema.

Early life and education
Mukul was born in Chennai, Tamil Nadu. He is an MBA from IIM Ahmedabad and it was after working in a bank in New York City that he decided to take his passion for acting forward.

Personal life
Mukul has been married to actress Rasika Dugal since 2010 after dating for 3 years.

Filmography

Films

Web series

Awards and nominations

References

External links

Indian male actors
Living people
Year of birth missing (living people)
Indian male film actors
Male actors in Hindi cinema
Male actors from Mumbai
Indian stage actors
Indian Institute of Management Ahmedabad alumni
Indian Institute of Management Ahmedabad
Indian Institute of Management Ahmedabad
Indian Institutes of Management alumni